Christopher Stockton (born 5 April 1969) is a British auto racing driver, who is known for his efforts in the British Touring Car Championship, and British and International GT racing

Racing career

Early years
Born in Chester, Stockton won 14 Formula Ford races including the Kent Festival at Brands Hatch over three seasons between 1999 and 2001. He then won 5 races in a full seasons racing in the Legends series, breaking several lap records. In 2003/4 Stockton raced a TVR Tuscan in the National TVR Tuscan Challenge. He placed the car on the front row at Rockingham only 3/1000 of a second off pole on his first appearance. He then went on to repeatedly beat the reigning Champion Lee Caroline in the seven meetings he competed in. There were several very memorable battles with Caroline, Keen, Hay and others.

Le Mans 24 Hours
In 2004 Stockton was one of the 6 drivers who raced a brace of TVR Tuscan T400's at Le Mans under the Chamberlain-Synergy Motorsport banner. He was the quickest of the 6 drivers in qualifying, and consistently produced the fastest race laps during his 10 hour multiple stints behind the wheel. His car was the first TVR to complete the French marathon.

British GT Championship
In 2005 Stockton raced intermittently in the British GT Championship alongside Andy Britnell in a Porsche 996. He started the season with Team ARO before switching to Motorbase Performance prior to the Croft round where they went on to take an outright win in the second race and the first win for Motorbase. The pair also took a class win at Silverstone on the International circuit partnering.

British Touring Car Championship

BTC Racing (2006–2008)

He made his debut in the BTCC series behind the wheel of a BTC Racing Lexus IS200 at Brands Hatch on 24 September 2006, alongside then team-mate Darren Dowling. He completed the last 2 meetings of the 2006 season.

In 2007 he continued with the BTC Racing team and was joined by Nick Leason in the second car. Stockton suffered a disappointing year with mechanical problems hindering the team's progress.

Stockton continued in the BTC Racing entry in 2008. His team-mate was the successful truck racer Stuart Oliver. From round 3 the team switched to ex-Motorbase Performance SEAT Toledo Cupras. Despite having never previously driven in a front-wheel-drive racing car, Stockton finished 8th in race 2, his best ever finish – though he was helped by the intermittently wet conditions hampering the BMWs.

With the sale of both of the teams SEAT Toledos to Maxtreme without purchasing a suitable replacement, the team announced they would not enter the series again in 2009.

Thorney Motorsport (2012)
Stockton returned to the BTCC for the final two races of the 2012 season driving an NGTC Vauxhall Insignia VXR-R for Thorney Motorsport. He was forced to withdraw from the Silverstone event due to illness, where he was replaced by Tony Gilham.

BTC Racing (2014–)

In October 2012, Stockton revealed he had purchased an incomplete NGTC Chevrolet Cruze from RML which he intended to finish and enter in the 2013 season under the BTC Racing banner. Despite being entered the team did not appear at any races during the 2013 season. Stockton and BTC Racing were granted an entry for the 2014 season under the new TOCA licence system.

GT4
In 2011 Stockton linked up with Ginetta to race in the European FIA GT4 series organised by SRO. He was fastest in free practice three times but this was not converted into wins, but good race pace showed promise.

2012 saw Stockton racing an M3 GT4 in the Dutch GT4 Championship for the first two rounds of the season, gaining fastest testing times and P4. A substantial accident curtailed the remainder of the season.

International GT3 Open 2017-
Stockton is set to share a Bentley Continental GT3, with reigning British GT Cup Champion Jordan Witt. The pair will race for the Crewe based outfit, Jordan Racing. The car is supported by the factory squad M Sport and managed by Simon Leonard ( Redline Racing).
The squad were P5 at the official Championship test day at Catalunya ( Barcelona), on 17 February 2017.

Other activities
He is also a former top-level point to point jockey. His wife Polly is a member of the British Class Performance squad in horse riding. He is owner of furniture company Ningbo and a bulk hauler company Ningbo walking floor distribution

Racing record

24 Hours of Le Mans results

Complete British Touring Car Championship results
(key)

References

External links
MD of Ningbo Distribution
MD of Ningbo Furniture
Profile at BTCCPages.com

1969 births
British Touring Car Championship drivers
Living people
English racing drivers
European Le Mans Series drivers